Sex, Death and Bowling is a 2015 American independent comedy-drama film starring  Adrian Grenier, Selma Blair, Bailey Chase, Drea de Matteo and Joshua Rush. It marked the directing and writing debut of actress Ally Walker.

Plot 
Sean McAllister is a successful fashion designer who returns home to a small, rural town in southern California when he learns his brother, Rick, has cancer. Sean has been gone for a while ever since getting into an argument with his father. Rick lives at home with his wife, Glenn, and his live-in nurse Ana. Sean and Rick's father Dick owns a local sports equipment shop and is an avid bowler. Rick's son, Eli idolizes his father and his grandfather and wishes to become as good a bowler as the two of them. Sean arrives and immediately begins opening up old wounds with his father. Sean is gay, and an incident when he was younger involving another boy from the high school football team whom a teacher saw brought shame to Dick, resulting in the two becoming distant even after Sean's rise to fame. Sean tries to reconcile with both his father and his brother, but it proves difficult.

Dick is trying to win a bowling tournament, the Fiesta Bowl, but trouble arises when one of his bowlers becomes injured. Trying to reconnect with his father and family, Sean agrees to join the team. They eventually win the tournament, and bring home the trophy to Rick.

Cast  
 
 Adrian Grenier as Sean McAllister 
 Selma Blair as Glenn McAllister
 Bailey Chase as Rick McAllister
 Justin Prentice as Teenage Rick
 Melora Walters as Evie
 Drea de Matteo as Ana
 Mary Lynn Rajskub as Kim Wells
 Daniel Hugh Kelly as Dick McAllister
 Joshua Rush as Eli McAllister
 Drew Powell as Tim Hollister
 Googy Gress as Dan Cornfielder
 Richard Riehle as Father Joe
 Erica Gimpel as Shanti

References

External links
 

2015 comedy-drama films
American comedy-drama films
American independent films
2015 independent films
2015 directorial debut films
2015 films
2010s English-language films
2010s American films